Two human polls made up the 2017–18 NCAA Division I men's ice hockey rankings, the USCHO.com/CBS College Sports poll and the USA Today/USA Hockey Magazine poll. As the 2017–18 season progressed, rankings were updated weekly.

Legend

USCHO

USA Today

References

NCAA Division I ice hockey
College men's ice hockey rankings in the United States